NRI Haadsa is a crime-based episodic show inspired by true stories of crimes involving non-resident Indians in India. The 14-part series showcases stories of kidnapping, murder, a faux marriage proposal and many other crimes aired by Colors TV, Voot and MX Player. The series is hosted by Rushad Rana.

Cast and crew

Cast 
 Roma Arora
 Arvika Gupta
 Vicky Singh
 Roselin Sonia Gomes
 Jiya Chauhan
 Nidhi Bhavsar
 Sameer Onkar
 Nishi Yadav
 Prachi Vaishnav

Host 
 Rushad Rana

Casting By 
 Shubham Bairagi

References 

2020s Indian television series
Indian crime television series